Occupational licensing, also called occupational licensure, is a form of government regulation requiring a license to pursue a particular profession or vocation for compensation. It is related to occupational closure.
Professions that can have a large negative effect on individuals, like physicians, public accountants, and lawyers, require occupational licenses in most developed countries, but many jurisdictions also require licenses for professions without that possibility, like plumbers, taxi drivers, and electricians. Licensing creates a regulatory barrier to entry into licensed occupations, and this results in higher income for those with licenses and usually higher costs for consumers. 

Licensing advocates argue that it protects the public interest by keeping incompetent and unscrupulous individuals from working with the public. However, there is little evidence that it affects the overall quality of services provided to customers by members of the regulated occupation.  A 1983 study found that some occupational licensing schemes tended to exclude minorities and disadvantaged populations from entering such trades. However, a more recent study from 2009 found the opposite.

History 
Traditionally, occupations in the crafts professions and in the liberal professions organize their respective industries in guilds and chambers in European countries like Germany and Austria. One of the most important changes in licensing has been the 2004 reform in Germany, where workers in 53 of 94 crafts professions were not required to be licensed anymore in order to start a business. In 2020, 12 of these deregulated professions reinstated the licensing requirement.

In the United States, licensing has been among the fastest-growing labor market institutions. The figure shows the growth of occupational licensing relative to the decline of union membership since the 1950s.

By 2008 occupational licensing in the U.S. had grown to 29 percent of the workforce, up from below five percent in the 1950s. In contrast, unions represented as much as 33 percent of the U.S. workforce in the 1950s, but declined to less than 12 percent of the U.S. workforce by 2008.

Economic effects 
One simple theory of occupational licensing envisions a costless supply of unbiased, capable gatekeepers, and enforcers. The gatekeepers screen entrants to the occupation, barring those whose skills or character suggest a tendency toward low-quality output. The enforcers monitor incumbents and discipline those whose performance is below standard with punishments that may include revocation of the license needed to practise. Assuming that entry and performance are controlled in these ways, the quality of service in the profession will almost automatically be maintained at or above standards that are set by the gatekeeper to the profession. Within this approach, only those who have the funds to invest in training and the ability to do the work are able to enter the occupation.

Introducing economics to this otherwise mechanical model by noting that a key discipline on incumbents—the threat of revoking one's license—may not mean much if incumbents can easily re-enter the profession, such as by moving to a new firm, or by shifting to an alternative occupation with little loss of income. Since grandfathering (i.e., allowing current workers to bypass the new requirements) is the norm when occupations seek to become licensed, incumbent workers are usually supportive of the regulation process. In the absence of grandfathering, lower-skilled workers in the occupation may have to seek alternative employment. For example, if sales skills are the key to both providing licensed sales of heart monitors and the non-licensed selling of shoes or cars, then individuals may shift between these lines of work with little loss of income.
 
Under these circumstances, meaningful discipline for license holders may require deliberate steps to ensure that loss of license entails significant financial loss. Such additional steps could include the imposition of fines, improved screening to prevent expelled practitioners from re-entering the occupation, or requiring all incumbents to put up capital that would be forfeited upon loss of the license. To offset the possibility that incumbents could shift to other occupations with little loss of income, entry requirements could be tightened to limit supply and create monopoly rents within the licensed occupation (rent-seeking). The threat of losing these monopoly rents could, in principle, give incentives to incumbents to maintain quality standards. This may also result in some increases in human capital investments in order to attain additional requirements. The rents could also motivate potential entrants to invest in high levels of training in order to gain admittance. This suggests that licensing can raise quality within an industry by restricting supply, raising labor wages, and raising output prices. Increasing prices may signal either enhanced quality due to perceived or actual skill enhancements or restrictions on the supply of regulated workers.

State-regulated occupations can use political institutions to restrict supply and raise the wages of licensed practitioners. There is assumed to be a once-and-for-all income gain that accrues to current members of the occupation who are "grandfathered" in, and do not have to meet the newly established standard. Generally, workers who are "grandfathered" are not required to ever meet the standards of the new entrants. Individuals who attempt to enter the occupation in the future will need to balance the economic rents of the field's increased monopoly power against the greater difficulty of meeting the entrance requirements.

Once an occupation is regulated, members of that occupation in a geographic or political jurisdiction can implement tougher statutes or examination pass rates and may gain relative to those who have easier requirements by further restricting the supply of labor and obtaining economic rents for incumbents (credentialism and educational inflation). Restrictions would include raising the pass rate on licensing exams, imposing higher general and specific requirements, and implementing tougher residency requirements that limit new arrivals in the area from qualifying for a license. Moreover, individuals who have finished schooling in the occupation may decide not to go to a particular political jurisdiction where the pass rate is low because both the economic and shame costs may be high.

Conversely, efforts can be made at interstate reciprocity, so that a license or a certification earned in one federated state or province qualifies the holder to practice in any of the other states or provinces of the federation, which can lower the overall cost and burden of adequately staffing the profession in all regions. For example, high demand and low supply for nurses or for teachers, in any particular region, can be alleviated if the red tape is reduced, as long as that reduction does not truly harm competence and preparedness. 

The effect of not reducing that administrative burden has been measured by a 2017 analysis that found that occupational licensing in different American states reduced between-state migration of individuals in professions with divergent licensing by 36 percent relative to members of other occupations, while workers in nationally licensed occupations showed no evidence of reduced interstate migration. A 2020 follow up study by the same authors found that "the magnitude of the effect can only account for a small part of the overall decline in [interstate migration] seen in recent decades."

In April 2019, Arizona became the first US state to recognize out-of-state occupational licenses.

Evidence on the effects of occupational licensing 

It is well understood that occupational licensing can serve as a barrier to occupational entry resulting in reduced employment, monopoly rents for workers in the occupation, and higher prices for consumers (Friedman, 1962).

Kleiner and Krueger (2010 and 2013) show that after controlling for education, labor market experience, occupation, and other controls, licensing is associated with a 15 to 18 percent wage premium in the labor market.  This estimate may partially reflect a premium for higher unmeasured human capital, but it is also consistent and likely in large part due to rents.

The empirical work on the effects of licensing on employment levels or growth rates, but the existing estimates suggest that they could be large. Kleiner (2006) examined employment growth rates in states and occupations with stronger versus weaker occupational licensing requirements.  Specifically, he compares employment growth between 1990 and 2000 of occupations that are licensed in some states to the same occupations that are not licensed in other states. In order to account for differential growth rates between states, he also compared the growth rate of occupations that are either fully licensed or fully unlicensed in both sets of states. Using a "difference-in-difference" regression analysis, Kleiner found that partially licensed occupations had a 20 percent lower growth rate in states with licensing relative to states without licensing and relative to the difference in growth rates between these sets of states of fully licensed and fully unlicensed occupations.  This estimate implies that a licensed occupation that grew at a 10 percent rate between 1990 and 2000 would have grown at a 12 percent rate if it were unregulated.

With occupational licensing varying by state, another channel through which licensing can affect employment is through reduced mobility.  The patchwork of regulations raises the cost of cross-state mobility for workers in these occupations.  This will result in slower adjustment costs to regional economic shocks which can result in higher unemployment.

Because it restricts employment, licensing can also lead to higher prices for services faced by consumers.  This has been documented in a number of studies including Shepard (1978), Bond, et al. (1980) Cox and Foster (1990), and Kleiner and Todd (2009).

While it is not possible to precisely estimate the effects of substantially reducing occupational licensing at the present time, both theory and the available evidence suggest that such a reduction could translate into significantly higher employment, better job matches, and improved customer satisfaction.  Low-income consumers, in particular, would benefit because reduced barriers to entry would reduce the prices of services provided (Shapiro, 1986 and Cox and Foster, 1990). For Germany, a study exploits the deregulation of occupational licenses called Meister for 53 occupations in 2004 as a natural experiment. It finds that this policy change increased the propensity to work as self-employed substantially.

Without doing a detailed analysis at the occupation-by-occupation and state level, economists cannot say which occupations can be justified based on quality-consideration, though studies have been conducted they have found at least in a number of cases at different stages of licensing reduces employment, but does not result in better services (Kleiner, 2013). For example, Kleiner and Kudrle (2000) find that occupational licensing of dentists does not lead to improved measured dental outcomes of patients, but is associated with higher prices of certain services, likely because there are fewer dentists.

A study from the Mercatus Center showed that occupational licensing can lead to greater income inequality, with each step needed to open a business leading to an additional 1.4% of national income going to the top 10% of earners.

A 2019 NBER paper found that occupational licensing contributed to an average welfare loss of 12 percent.

In the case of midwifery, the introduction of occupation licensing led to substantial reductions in maternal mortality.

Alternatives

Government regulation 
To distinguish various forms of regulation, there are three forms of government regulation of occupations:

 Licensing: Licensing refers to situations in which it is unlawful to carry out a specified range of activities for pay without first having obtained a license.  This confirms that the license holder meets prescribed standards of competence. Workers who require such licenses to practice include doctors, lawyers, nurses, civil engineers, and surveyors.
 State Certification: is generally necessary in order to obtain a license to practice an occupation. The certification requirements include passing of a standardized, state-administered test and proof of minimum experience working under the supervision of a licensed practitioner. New entrants to the occupation can start working as trainees such as "apprentice electrician". Some workers in an occupation may never get certified and licensed but can continue working under the supervision of a licensed person indefinitely. 
 Registration: Registration refers to situations in which one can register one's name and address and qualifications with the appropriate regulatory body. Registration provides a standard for being on the list, but complaints from consumers or improper listing of credentials can result in removal from the list.

Professional certification 
In contrast to government regulation, voluntary professional certification can be used to demonstrate competence without the harmful economic effects of legalized occupational barriers. Examples of professional associations and trade associations that provide voluntary professional certification in various fields include:
 National Institute for Automotive Service Excellence
 CompTIA
 (ISC)²
 Project Management Institute
 American Meteorological Society

See also 
 Employment protection legislation
 Labor economics
 Labour market flexibility
 Law and economics
 Loss aversion
 Professional certification
 Regulatory capture
 Regulatory state
 Rent-seeking

References

Further reading

External links 
 
 
 
 

Labour economics
Libertarian theory
Licensing
Anti-competitive practices